The Women's United Soccer Association (WUSA) was the world's first women's soccer league in which all the players were paid as professionals. Founded in February 2000, the league began its first season in April 2001 with eight teams in the United States. The league suspended operations on September 15, 2003, shortly after the end of its third season, after making cumulative losses of around US$100 million.

History

Establishment
As a result of the US women's national team's (USWNT) first-place showing in the 1999 FIFA Women's World Cup, a seemingly viable market for the sport germinated.

Feeding on the momentum of their victory, the twenty USWNT players, in partnership with John Hendricks of the Discovery Channel, sought out the investors, markets, and players necessary to form the eight-team league. The twenty founding players were Michelle Akers, Brandi Chastain, Tracy Ducar, Lorrie Fair, Joy Fawcett, Danielle Fotopoulos, Julie Foudy, Mia Hamm, Kristine Lilly, Shannon MacMillan, Tiffeny Milbrett, Carla Overbeck, Cindy Parlow, Christie Pearce, Tiffany Roberts, Briana Scurry, Kate (Markgraf) Sobrero, Tisha Venturini, Saskia Webber, and Sara Whalen.

Initial investment in the league was provided by the following:

 Time Warner Cable, $5 million 
 Cox Enterprises, $5 million
 Cox Communications, $5 million
 Amos Hostetter Jr., $5 million
 Comcast Corporation, $5 million
 John Hendricks and Comcast Corporation, $2.5 million each
 Amos Hostetter Jr. and John Hendricks, $2.5 million each

The U.S. Soccer Federation approved membership of the league as a sanctioned Division 1 women's professional soccer league on August 18, 2000. Tony DiCicco was made commissioner.

Organization

Media coverage 

At various times, games were televised on TNT, CNNSI, ESPN2, PAX TV, and various local and regional sports channels.

Teams 

The WUSA franchises were located in Philadelphia; Boston; New York City; Washington, D.C.; Cary, N.C.; Atlanta; San Jose, Ca.; and San Diego:

For the inaugural season, each roster primarily consisted of players from the United States, although up to four international players were allowed on each team's roster. Among the international players were China's Sun Wen, Pu Wei, Fan Yunjie, Zhang Ouying, Gao Hong, Zhao Lihong, and Bai Jie; Germany's Birgit Prinz, Conny Pohlers, Steffi Jones and Maren Meinert; Norway's Hege Riise, Unni Lehn, and Dagny Mellgren; Brazil's Sissi, Kátia and Pretinha; and Canada's Charmaine Hooper, Sharolta Nonen, and Christine Latham.

The league also hosted singular talents from nations which were not then at the forefront of women's soccer, such as Maribel Dominguez of Mexico, Homare Sawa of Japan, Julie Fleeting of Scotland, Cheryl Salisbury of Australia, Marinette Pichon of France, and Kelly Smith of England.

WUSA Awards

Founders Cup champions 

The Founders Cup (named in honor of the 20 founding players) was awarded to the winner of a four-team, single-elimination postseason playoff.

"asdet" stands for "after sudden death extra time". WUSA's sudden death overtime was 15 minutes long (two 7½-minute periods) and used only in the playoffs.

League suspension 

The WUSA played for three full seasons, suspending operations on September 15, 2003, shortly after the conclusion of the third season. Neither television ratings nor attendance met forecasts, while the league spent its initial $40 million budget, planned to last five years, by the end of the first season. Even though the players took salary cuts of up to 30% for the final season, with the founding players (who also held an equity stake in the league) taking the largest cuts, that was not enough to bring expenses under control. In the hopes of an eventual relaunch of the league, all rights to team names, logos, and similar properties were preserved. Efforts to line up new sources of capital and operating funds continued. In June 2004, the WUSA held two "WUSA Festivals" in Los Angeles and Blaine, Minnesota, featuring matches between reconstituted WUSA teams (often with marquee players borrowed from other teams), in order to maintain the league in the public eye and sustain interest in women's professional soccer.

With the WUSA on hiatus, the Women's Premier Soccer League (WPSL) and the W-League regained their status as the premier women's soccer leagues in the United States, and many former WUSA players joined those teams.

A new women's professional soccer league in the United States called Women's Professional Soccer started in 2009. However, that league suspended operations in January 2012.

See also
 List of WUSA drafts
 Women's Professional Soccer
 National Women's Soccer League
 Women's sports

References 

 
Sports leagues established in 2000
Sports leagues disestablished in 2003
Defunct women's soccer leagues in the United States
Defunct professional sports leagues in the United States
2000 establishments in the United States
2003 disestablishments in the United States